Jacques "Jacky" Bade (born 2 November 1945) is a former professional footballer who played as a defender. Born in Guadeloupe, he played for the France amateur national team and represented Guadeloupe at senior level during his career.

Club career
Bade played for several different clubs during his career. He initially started off as a youth player for his hometown club of  before joining FC Tarascon in France. He had departed to metropolitan France in 1964 in order to pursue medical studies.

In January 1966, Bade joined Division 1 club Toulouse. However, he would only make a total of two appearances for the club, leaving in 1967. Three years later, he signed for amateur club Albi.

In 1973, Bade signed for Paris Saint-Germain, joining to help the Parisian defense. He therefore reunited with his mentor Just Fontaine (manager of PSG at the time), with whom he had shared a linked path in Toulouse, Albi, and Paris. With PSG, Bade would go on to make 62 appearances across all competitions. He retired at the age of 31 in 1976 after suffering a serious ligament injury.

International career 
Bade previously played for the France amateur national team. He also represented his native island of Guadeloupe at cadet, youth, and senior level.

Player profile 
Being a defender, Bade's style of play was compared to the one of Marius Trésor for his strong interventions in play. However, despite his capabilities, he was injury-prone, having dealt with various adductor and ligament injuries during his career.

After football 
After having completed his final exam in pediatrics a couple of months after retiring from football in 1976, Bade returned to Guadeloupe and opened a pediatric office in Pointe-à-Pitre. He still worked in this job as of 2013. From 1990 up to at least 2013, he was president of the Football Artistique Club (FAC), who participated in numerous friendly matches.

Personal life 
Jacky's father Ludovic was the mayor of Capesterre-de-Marie-Galante, Jacky's birthplace, from 1935 to 1971.

His brother José died in 1994. He was a big fan of sports and cycling. A stadium in Capesterre was named in honour of him.

References

External links 
 
 

1945 births
Living people
People from Capesterre-de-Marie-Galante
French footballers
Guadeloupean footballers
French people of Guadeloupean descent
Black French sportspeople
Association football defenders
Guadeloupe international footballers
France amateur international footballers
Toulouse FC players
US Albi players
Paris Saint-Germain F.C. players
Ligue 1 players
Championnat de France Amateur (1935–1971) players
French Division 3 (1971–1993) players
Ligue 2 players